The 2007–08 season of the Moroccan Throne Cup was the 52nd edition of the Cup. It started on 28 October 2007.

The cup was won by FAR de Rabat, who beat Maghreb de Fès in the final.

3rd Round

4th Round

5th Round 
This round saw the entry of clubs from GNF 2

Last 32 
This round saw the entry of clubs from the Botola. The round took place on 20 February 2008.

Last 16 
The draw took place on 27 March 2008.

Quarter-finals 
The draw took place on 22 April 2008.

Semi-finals 
The draw took place on 22 April 2008. The semi-finals took place at the El Harti Stadium in Marrakech.

Final

Number of teams by division by round

See also 

 2007–08 Botola

External links 
  FRMF

2007
2007–08 in Moroccan football